The BYD M3 or BYD M3 DM is a light, commercial and leisure activity, 5-door van designed and produced by the Chinese automaker BYD.

BYD M3 and M3 DM

The BYD M3 DM mini MPV was previewed by the M3 DM Concept during the 2014 Beijing Auto Show, with the DM meaning Dual-Mode for hybrid drivetrain BYD models.

The M3 DM is powered by a dual-mode hybrid drivetrain, consisting of a 1.5 liter four-cylinder petrol engine producing 109 hp and an electric motor producing 150 hp, good for a combined output of 259 hp. The 0-100 acceleration claimed by BYD is 7.5 seconds. Range of the M3 DM in pure electric mode is 60 kilometers.

The internal combustion version is the BYD M3 which features the same design with traditional grilles. MSRP starts from around 75,000 yuan.

BYD T3

The BYD T3 is a pure-electric mini van launched by BYD at the 2015 Shanghai Auto Show, and is the electric version of the BYD M3 light commercial vehicle. It was never actually made available to the market, but Chinese government officials such as post offices were able to acquire fleets to be used as state-financed vehicles. The T3 name was originally used on a truck or commercial van version of the BYD e6 prototype. However the vehicle that was finally released wearing the BYD T3 nameplate shares the platform with the BYD M3.

Starting in 2021, BYD will export the T3 to Norway to supply fleets there.

Starting in Late 2021, BYD will export the T3 to Australia via EVDirect 

Starting in 2021 in Thailand, DKSH Thailand, a provider of market expansion services in Asia, has partnered with Loxley Plc to trial the use of BYD's T3 100% electric van at DKSH's Bang Na distribution centre to tackle air pollution and promote zero-emission solutions.

References

External links

 Official BYD T3 site , Singapore
 BYD T3 detailed info
 BYD M3 (Shang) detailed info

Vans
Minivans
Mini MPVs
Electric vans
Vehicles introduced in 2014
2010s cars
Front-wheel-drive vehicles
Cars of China
Plug-in hybrid vehicles
Production electric cars